In mathematics, a relative scalar (of weight w) is a scalar-valued function whose transform under a coordinate transform,

on an n-dimensional manifold obeys the following equation

where

 

that is, the determinant of the Jacobian of the transformation. A scalar density refers to the  case.

Relative scalars are an important special case of the more general concept of a relative tensor.

Ordinary scalar
An ordinary scalar or absolute scalar refers to the  case.

If  and  refer to the same point  on the manifold, then we desire . Of course, "new" or "original" is a relative concept.

There are many physical quantities that are represented by ordinary scalars, such as temperature and pressure.

Weight 0 example
Suppose the temperature in a room is given in terms of the function  in Cartesian coordinates  and the function in cylindrical coordinates  is desired. The two coordinate systems are related by the following sets of equations:

and

Using  allows one to derive  as the transformed function.

A quick calculation shows that  and  also. This equality would have held for any chosen point .

One way to view these functions is as representations of the "parent" function that takes a point of the manifold as an argument and gives the temperature.

The problem could have been reversed. One could have been given  and wished to have derived the Cartesian temperature function . This just flips the notion of "new" vs the "original" coordinate system.

(Yes, integrating temperature is strange but that's partly what's to be shown.)

They are not equal. The integral of temperature is not independent of the coordinate
system used. It is non-physical in that sense, hence "strange". Note that if the integral of  included a factor of the Jacobian (which is just ),
we get

which is equal to the original integral but it is not however the integral of temperature because
temperature is a relative scalar of weight 0, not a relative scalar of weight 1.

Weight 1 example
If we had said  was representing mass density, however, then its transformed value
should include the Jacobian factor that takes into account the geometric distortion of the coordinate
system. The transformed function is now . This time
 but . As before
is integral (the total mass) in Cartesian coordinates is

They are equal. The integral of mass density gives total mass which is a coordinate-independent concept.
Note that if the integral of  also included a factor of the Jacobian like before, we get

which is not equal to the previous case.

Other cases
Weights other than 0 and 1 do not arise as often. It can be shown the determinant of a type (0,2) tensor is a relative scalar of weight 2.

See also
Jacobian matrix and determinant

References

Tensors
Tensors in general relativity
Scalars